Ivyton is an unincorporated community in Magoffin County, Kentucky, United States.  It lies along Route 114 southeast of the city of Salyersville, the county seat of Magoffin County.  Its elevation is 984 feet (300 m).

A post office was established in the community in 1883. The town was named for the natural abundance of ivy.

References

Unincorporated communities in Magoffin County, Kentucky
Unincorporated communities in Kentucky